The Stewards' Challenge Cup is a rowing event for men's coxless fours at the annual Henley Royal Regatta on the River Thames at Henley-on-Thames in England.  It is open to male crews from all eligible rowing clubs. Two or more clubs may combine to make an entry.

The event was established in 1841.
 It was originally for coxed four crews. In 1868 Walter Bradford Woodgate arranged for his  Brasenose cox to jump overboard at the start of the race to lighten his boat. While the unwanted cox narrowly escaped strangulation by the water lilies, Woodgate and his home-made steering device triumphed by 100 yards and were promptly disqualified. Whatever passing fame the hapless cox gained on the Henley reach in 1868 was eventually eclipsed by his accomplishments in later life when he, Frederic Edward Weatherly, wrote and published the Irish ballad "Danny Boy".

A special prize for four-oared crews without coxswains was offered at the regatta in 1869 when it was won by the Oxford Radleian Club. When Stewards’ became a coxless race in 1873, Woodgate “won his moral victory,” the Rowing Almanack later recalled.  “Nothing but defeating a railway in an action at law could have given him so much pleasure.”<ref>The Rowing Almanack, 1921</u>, pp. 148-49</ref>

Winners

References

Events at Henley Royal Regatta
Rowing trophies and awards